This is a list of electoral results for the electoral district of Avon in Western Australian state elections.

Members for Avon

Election results

Elections in the 2000s

Elections in the 1990s

Elections in the 1980s

Elections in the 1970s

Elections in the 1960s

Elections in the 1950s 

 Preferences were not distributed.

Elections in the 1940s

Elections in the 1930s

Elections in the 1920s

Elections in the 1910s 

 Harrison's designation at the 1914 election was simply "Country", rather than "National Country".

References

Western Australian state electoral results by district